The 2005–06 Minnesota Wild season was the team's sixth season in the National Hockey League (NHL). The Wild failed to qualify for the 2006 Stanley Cup playoffs.

Off-season

Regular season
The Wild allowed the fewest power-play goals in the NHL with 55 and had the highest penalty-kill percentage at 87.39%.

Final standings

Schedule and results

|- align="center" bgcolor="#CCFFCC" 
|1||W||October 5, 2005||6–3 || align="left"|  Calgary Flames (2005–06) ||1–0–0 || 
|- align="center" bgcolor="#FFBBBB"
|2||L||October 8, 2005||1–2 || align="left"| @ Phoenix Coyotes (2005–06) ||1–1–0 || 
|- align="center" 
|3||L||October 9, 2005||1–2 OT|| align="left"| @ Los Angeles Kings (2005–06) ||1–1–1 || 
|- align="center" bgcolor="#CCFFCC" 
|4||W||October 12, 2005||6–0 || align="left"|  Vancouver Canucks (2005–06) ||2–1–1 || 
|- align="center" bgcolor="#FFBBBB"
|5||L||October 14, 2005||3–5 || align="left"|  Vancouver Canucks (2005–06) ||2–2–1 || 
|- align="center" bgcolor="#CCFFCC" 
|6||W||October 16, 2005||4–1 || align="left"|  Mighty Ducks of Anaheim (2005–06) ||3–2–1 || 
|- align="center" bgcolor="#CCFFCC" 
|7||W||October 19, 2005||6–1 || align="left"|  San Jose Sharks (2005–06) ||4–2–1 || 
|- align="center" bgcolor="#CCFFCC" 
|8||W||October 22, 2005||3–2 || align="left"| @ St. Louis Blues (2005–06) ||5–2–1 || 
|- align="center" bgcolor="#FFBBBB"
|9||L||October 23, 2005||2–4 || align="left"| @ Chicago Blackhawks (2005–06) ||5–3–1 || 
|- align="center" bgcolor="#FFBBBB"
|10||L||October 25, 2005||1–3 || align="left"|  Vancouver Canucks (2005–06) ||5–4–1 || 
|- align="center" 
|11||L||October 28, 2005||1–2 SO|| align="left"| @ Columbus Blue Jackets (2005–06) ||5–4–2 || 
|- align="center" bgcolor="#CCFFCC" 
|12||W||October 29, 2005||3–1 || align="left"|  Columbus Blue Jackets (2005–06) ||6–4–2 || 
|-

|- align="center" bgcolor="#FFBBBB"
|13||L||November 1, 2005||0–3 || align="left"| @ Calgary Flames (2005–06) ||6–5–2 || 
|- align="center" bgcolor="#FFBBBB"
|14||L||November 2, 2005||1–2 || align="left"| @ Vancouver Canucks (2005–06) ||6–6–2 || 
|- align="center" bgcolor="#CCFFCC" 
|15||W||November 5, 2005||3–1 || align="left"| @ San Jose Sharks (2005–06) ||7–6–2 || 
|- align="center" bgcolor="#CCFFCC" 
|16||W||November 6, 2005||4–3 SO|| align="left"| @ Mighty Ducks of Anaheim (2005–06) ||8–6–2 || 
|- align="center" bgcolor="#FFBBBB"
|17||L||November 8, 2005||2–4 || align="left"|  Phoenix Coyotes (2005–06) ||8–7–2 || 
|- align="center" bgcolor="#FFBBBB"
|18||L||November 11, 2005||1–3 || align="left"| @ Detroit Red Wings (2005–06) ||8–8–2 || 
|- align="center" bgcolor="#FFBBBB"
|19||L||November 14, 2005||2–3 || align="left"| @ Calgary Flames (2005–06) ||8–9–2 || 
|- align="center" bgcolor="#CCFFCC" 
|20||W||November 19, 2005||4–2 || align="left"|  Nashville Predators (2005–06) ||9–9–2 || 
|- align="center" bgcolor="#FFBBBB"
|21||L||November 23, 2005||3–4 || align="left"|  Edmonton Oilers (2005–06) ||9–10–2 || 
|- align="center" bgcolor="#CCFFCC" 
|22||W||November 25, 2005||5–3 || align="left"|  St. Louis Blues (2005–06) ||10–10–2 || 
|- align="center" 
|23||L||November 30, 2005||2–3 SO|| align="left"|  Columbus Blue Jackets (2005–06) ||10–10–3 || 
|-

|- align="center" bgcolor="#FFBBBB"
|24||L||December 1, 2005||1–2 || align="left"| @ Nashville Predators (2005–06) ||10–11–3 || 
|- align="center" 
|25||L||December 3, 2005||2–3 SO|| align="left"| @ New Jersey Devils (2005–06) ||10–11–4 || 
|- align="center" bgcolor="#FFBBBB"
|26||L||December 5, 2005||1–3 || align="left"| @ New York Rangers (2005–06) ||10–12–4 || 
|- align="center" bgcolor="#CCFFCC" 
|27||W||December 8, 2005||5–0 || align="left"| @ Pittsburgh Penguins (2005–06) ||11–12–4 || 
|- align="center" bgcolor="#FFBBBB"
|28||L||December 10, 2005||2–3 || align="left"| @ Philadelphia Flyers (2005–06) ||11–13–4 || 
|- align="center" bgcolor="#FFBBBB"
|29||L||December 11, 2005||2–3 || align="left"|  Buffalo Sabres (2005–06) ||11–14–4 || 
|- align="center" bgcolor="#CCFFCC" 
|30||W||December 13, 2005||4–3 || align="left"| @ New York Islanders (2005–06) ||12–14–4 || 
|- align="center" bgcolor="#FFBBBB"
|31||L||December 15, 2005||2–3 || align="left"|  Boston Bruins (2005–06) ||12–15–4 || 
|- align="center" bgcolor="#CCFFCC" 
|32||W||December 17, 2005||4–3 OT|| align="left"|  Montreal Canadiens (2005–06) ||13–15–4 || 
|- align="center" bgcolor="#CCFFCC" 
|33||W||December 19, 2005||2–1 || align="left"|  Dallas Stars (2005–06) ||14–15–4 || 
|- align="center" bgcolor="#FFBBBB"
|34||L||December 22, 2005||3–4 || align="left"| @ Colorado Avalanche (2005–06) ||14–16–4 || 
|- align="center" bgcolor="#CCFFCC" 
|35||W||December 23, 2005||5–3 || align="left"|  Colorado Avalanche (2005–06) ||15–16–4 || 
|- align="center" bgcolor="#CCFFCC" 
|36||W||December 26, 2005||4–1 || align="left"| @ Edmonton Oilers (2005–06) ||16–16–4 || 
|- align="center" bgcolor="#CCFFCC" 
|37||W||December 28, 2005||4–2 || align="left"| @ Edmonton Oilers (2005–06) ||17–16–4 || 
|- align="center" bgcolor="#FFBBBB"
|38||L||December 29, 2005||2–4 || align="left"| @ Calgary Flames (2005–06) ||17–17–4 || 
|- align="center" bgcolor="#CCFFCC" 
|39||W||December 31, 2005||4–3 || align="left"|  Vancouver Canucks (2005–06) ||18–17–4 || 
|-

|- align="center" bgcolor="#CCFFCC" 
|40||W||January 3, 2006||4–2 || align="left"| @ Detroit Red Wings (2005–06) ||19–17–4 || 
|- align="center" bgcolor="#FFBBBB"
|41||L||January 5, 2006||2–4 || align="left"|  Colorado Avalanche (2005–06) ||19–18–4 || 
|- align="center" bgcolor="#CCFFCC" 
|42||W||January 7, 2006||4–1 || align="left"|  Mighty Ducks of Anaheim (2005–06) ||20–18–4 || 
|- align="center" bgcolor="#FFBBBB"
|43||L||January 9, 2006||1–2 || align="left"|  Dallas Stars (2005–06) ||20–19–4 || 
|- align="center" bgcolor="#FFBBBB"
|44||L||January 14, 2006||1–4 || align="left"|  Calgary Flames (2005–06) ||20–20–4 || 
|- align="center" bgcolor="#FFBBBB"
|45||L||January 16, 2006||1–6 || align="left"|  Ottawa Senators (2005–06) ||20–21–4 || 
|- align="center" bgcolor="#CCFFCC" 
|46||W||January 18, 2006||5–3 || align="left"|  Toronto Maple Leafs (2005–06) ||21–21–4 || 
|- align="center" bgcolor="#CCFFCC" 
|47||W||January 20, 2006||4–1 || align="left"|  Chicago Blackhawks (2005–06) ||22–21–4 || 
|- align="center" bgcolor="#CCFFCC" 
|48||W||January 22, 2006||3–2 || align="left"| @ Chicago Blackhawks (2005–06) ||23–21–4 || 
|- align="center" bgcolor="#CCFFCC" 
|49||W||January 24, 2006||3–2 || align="left"|  Phoenix Coyotes (2005–06) ||24–21–4 || 
|- align="center" bgcolor="#CCFFCC" 
|50||W||January 26, 2006||5–1 || align="left"|  Nashville Predators (2005–06) ||25–21–4 || 
|- align="center" bgcolor="#FFBBBB"
|51||L||January 27, 2006||3–4 || align="left"| @ Columbus Blue Jackets (2005–06) ||25–22–4 || 
|- align="center" bgcolor="#FFBBBB"
|52||L||January 30, 2006||4–5 || align="left"|  Detroit Red Wings (2005–06) ||25–23–4 || 
|- align="center" bgcolor="#FFBBBB"
|53||L||January 31, 2006||2–3 || align="left"| @ Colorado Avalanche (2005–06) ||25–24–4 || 
|-

|- align="center" bgcolor="#CCFFCC" 
|54||W||February 2, 2006||3–2 SO|| align="left"| @ San Jose Sharks (2005–06) ||26–24–4 || 
|- align="center" bgcolor="#CCFFCC" 
|55||W||February 4, 2006||6–4 || align="left"| @ Phoenix Coyotes (2005–06) ||27–24–4 || 
|- align="center" bgcolor="#CCFFCC" 
|56||W||February 7, 2006||5–1 || align="left"|  Los Angeles Kings (2005–06) ||28–24–4 || 
|- align="center" bgcolor="#FFBBBB"
|57||L||February 9, 2006||1–2 || align="left"|  Colorado Avalanche (2005–06) ||28–25–4 || 
|- align="center" bgcolor="#CCFFCC" 
|58||W||February 10, 2006||6–3 || align="left"| @ Edmonton Oilers (2005–06) ||29–25–4 || 
|- align="center" 
|59||L||February 12, 2006||2–3 OT|| align="left"| @ Vancouver Canucks (2005–06) ||29–25–5 || 
|- align="center" bgcolor="#FFBBBB"
|60||L||February 28, 2006||2–4 || align="left"| @ Colorado Avalanche (2005–06) ||29–26–5 || 
|-

|- align="center" bgcolor="#FFBBBB"
|61||L||March 2, 2006||2–3 || align="left"| @ Los Angeles Kings (2005–06) ||29–27–5 || 
|- align="center" bgcolor="#FFBBBB"
|62||L||March 3, 2006||2–4 || align="left"| @ Mighty Ducks of Anaheim (2005–06) ||29–28–5 || 
|- align="center" bgcolor="#CCFFCC" 
|63||W||March 5, 2006||5–3 || align="left"|  Colorado Avalanche (2005–06) ||30–28–5 || 
|- align="center" 
|64||L||March 7, 2006||2–3 OT|| align="left"|  Los Angeles Kings (2005–06) ||30–28–6 || 
|- align="center" 
|65||L||March 10, 2006||1–2 OT|| align="left"| @ St. Louis Blues (2005–06) ||30–28–7 || 
|- align="center" bgcolor="#CCFFCC" 
|66||W||March 12, 2006||4–3 || align="left"|  Edmonton Oilers (2005–06) ||31–28–7 || 
|- align="center" bgcolor="#FFBBBB"
|67||L||March 14, 2006||1–2 || align="left"|  Edmonton Oilers (2005–06) ||31–29–7 || 
|- align="center" bgcolor="#FFBBBB"
|68||L||March 19, 2006||2–3 || align="left"|  Calgary Flames (2005–06) ||31–30–7 || 
|- align="center" bgcolor="#CCFFCC" 
|69||W||March 21, 2006||3–1 || align="left"|  Calgary Flames (2005–06) ||32–30–7 || 
|- align="center" bgcolor="#FFBBBB"
|70||L||March 22, 2006||2–4 || align="left"| @ Dallas Stars (2005–06) ||32–31–7 || 
|- align="center" bgcolor="#FFBBBB"
|71||L||March 25, 2006||1–5 || align="left"|  San Jose Sharks (2005–06) ||32–32–7 || 
|- align="center" bgcolor="#CCFFCC" 
|72||W||March 28, 2006||3–2 || align="left"| @ Edmonton Oilers (2005–06) ||33–32–7 || 
|- align="center" bgcolor="#FFBBBB"
|73||L||March 29, 2006||1–2 || align="left"| @ Vancouver Canucks (2005–06) ||33–33–7 || 
|- align="center" bgcolor="#CCFFCC" 
|74||W||March 31, 2006||2–1 SO|| align="left"| @ Vancouver Canucks (2005–06) ||34–33–7 || 
|-

|- align="center" bgcolor="#FFBBBB"
|75||L||April 2, 2006||2–3 || align="left"|  Detroit Red Wings (2005–06) ||34–34–7 || 
|- align="center" bgcolor="#CCFFCC" 
|76||W||April 4, 2006||5–4 SO|| align="left"|  St. Louis Blues (2005–06) ||35–34–7 || 
|- align="center" bgcolor="#CCFFCC" 
|77||W||April 6, 2006||2–1 SO|| align="left"|  Edmonton Oilers (2005–06) ||36–34–7 || 
|- align="center" bgcolor="#FFBBBB"
|78||L||April 7, 2006||1–2 || align="left"| @ Calgary Flames (2005–06) ||36–35–7 || 
|- align="center" bgcolor="#CCFFCC" 
|79||W||April 9, 2006||5–2 || align="left"| @ Colorado Avalanche (2005–06) ||37–35–7 || 
|- align="center" bgcolor="#CCFFCC" 
|80||W||April 11, 2006||2–0 || align="left"|  Chicago Blackhawks (2005–06) ||38–35–7 || 
|- align="center" bgcolor="#FFBBBB"
|81||L||April 13, 2006||2–4 || align="left"| @ Nashville Predators (2005–06) ||38–36–7 || 
|- align="center" 
|82||L||April 15, 2006||3–4 OT|| align="left"| @ Dallas Stars (2005–06) ||38–36–8 || 
|-

|-
| Legend:

Player statistics

Scoring
 Position abbreviations: C = Center; D = Defense; G = Goaltender; LW = Left Wing; RW = Right Wing
  = Joined team via a transaction (e.g., trade, waivers, signing) during the season. Stats reflect time with the Wild only.
  = Left team via a transaction (e.g., trade, waivers, release) during the season. Stats reflect time with the Wild only.

Goaltending
  = Left team via a transaction (e.g., trade, waivers, release) during the season. Stats reflect time with the Wild only.

Awards and records

Awards

Transactions
The Wild were involved in the following transactions from February 17, 2005, the day after the 2004–05 NHL season was officially cancelled, through June 19, 2006, the day of the deciding game of the 2006 Stanley Cup Finals.

Trades

Players acquired

Players lost

Signings

Draft picks
Minnesota's picks at the 2005 NHL Entry Draft in Ottawa, Ontario.

See also
2005–06 NHL season

Notes

References

Minn
Minn
Minnesota Wild seasons